The 2021–22 Rhode Island Rams basketball team represented the University of Rhode Island during the 2021–22 NCAA Division I men's basketball season. The Rams, led by fourth-year head coach David Cox, played their home games at the Ryan Center in Kingston, Rhode Island as members of the Atlantic 10 Conference. They finished the season 15–16, 5–12 in A-10 play to finish in 11th place. They defeated Duquesne in the first round of the A-10 tournament before losing to Richmond in the second round.

On March 11, 2022, the school fired head coach David Cox. On March 18, the school hired former Dayton and Indiana head coach Archie Miller as the team's new head coach.

Previous season 
In a season limited due to the ongoing COVID-19 pandemic, the Rams finished the 2020–21 season 10–15, 7–10 in A-10 play to finish in 10th place. They lost in the second round of the A-10 tournament to Dayton.

Offseason

Departures

Incoming transfers

Recruiting classes

2021 recruiting class

2022 recruiting class

Roster

Schedule and results 

|-
!colspan=12 style=| Exhibition

|-
!colspan=12 style=| Non-conference regular season

|-
!colspan=12 style=| Atlantic 10 regular season

|-
!colspan=12 style=| A-10 tournament

Source

References

External links 
 Rhode Island Men's Basketball

Rhode Island Rams men's basketball seasons
Rhode Island
Rhode Island
Rhode Island